Hypsotropa diaphaea is a species of snout moth in the genus Hypsotropa. It was described by George Hampson in 1918 and is known from Malawi.

References

Moths described in 1918
Anerastiini